The 1909 Arkansas Razorbacks football team represented the University of Arkansas during the 1909 college football season. In their second year under head coach Hugo Bezdek, Arkansas (whose mascot before 1910 was the Cardinals) compiled a 7–0 record, shut out four of seven opponents, and outscored all opponents by a combined total of 186 to 18.

Oklahoma disputes the score of a 21–6 Arkansas win on October 23, but the team achieved its first ever perfect season at 7–0.

After defeating LSU in Memphis on November 13, Bezdek gave an impromptu press conference at the Fayetteville train station after the team arrived, stating that his team had "played like a wild band of razorback hogs!". The University of Arkansas students loved the reference, and the nickname stuck. By the next school year, the student body voted to change the school mascot from Cardinals to Razorbacks.

Amos Alonzo Stagg traveled to Little Rock and refereed the Arkansas-Washington game on Thanksgiving Day.

Arkansas was considered the unofficial "Champions of the South" for 1909.

Schedule

References

External links
 Hugo Bezdek And The 1909 Razorbacks

Arkansas
Arkansas Razorbacks football seasons
College football undefeated seasons
Arkansas Razorbacks football